Tommy Olsen (born 8 March 1973) is a Danish football manager and former professional player who played as a striker. He is the current manager for Såby Fodbold and previous for Taastrup FC and Køge Nord FC.

References

 
  Boldklubben Frem profile

1973 births
Living people
Danish men's footballers
Association football forwards
Danish Superliga players
Danish 1st Division players
Køge Boldklub players
FC Nordsjælland players
Boldklubben Frem players
Danish football managers
Køge Nord FC managers